The Western Boone Junior-Senior High School is a public high school located in Thorntown, Indiana.

State championships
Football
1988 IHSAA 2A Champions
2018 IHSAA 2A Champions
2019 IHSAA 2A Champions
2020 IHSAA 2A Champions

See also
 List of high schools in Indiana
 Sagamore Conference
 Thorntown, Indiana

References

External links 
 Official Website

Public high schools in Indiana
Schools in Boone County, Indiana